The 2015–16 Latvian Basketball League was the 25th season of the top basketball league of Latvia. The regular season started at the end of September and will end on April 27, 2016. The Playoffs finished on May 31, 2016.

VEF Rīga was the defending champion. Valmiera/ORDO won its first national championship this season.

Competition format
Eleven teams were expected to play in the league, as three of the teams (Jelgava, Saldus, and Valka/Valga) would confirm they meet the requirements yet. Finally, only Jelgava and Valka/Valga joined the league.

As Valka/Valga was finally admitted in the league, the club played both Latvian and Estonian leagues. For the LBL, Valka/Valga would play, as VEF Rīga, two legs in the regular season.

Teams

League table

Playoffs

Awards

Finals MVP

References

External links
Latvian Basketball Federation

Latvijas Basketbola līga
Latvian